Route 79 is a state highway located in Monmouth County in the U.S. state of New Jersey. It runs  from an intersection with U.S. Route 9 (US 9) in Freehold Township north to an intersection with Route 34 and County Route 516 Spur (CR 516 Spur) in Matawan. The route is a mostly two-lane undivided road that passes through a mixture of suburban residential, urban commercial, and open rural areas. The route intersects Route 33 in Freehold Township, Route 33 Business and CR 537 in Freehold Borough, Route 18 and CR 520 in Marlboro Township, and CR 516 in Matawan.

In 1927, the current alignment of Route 79 was designated as a part of Route 4, which was to run from Cape May to the George Washington Bridge, with US 9 additionally being designated along the route by the 1940s. After US 9 and Route 4 were moved to a new routing between Freehold and Cheesequake, the former route became Route 4A, a spur of Route 4. In 1953, Route 4A became Route 79 between Freehold and Matawan and an extension of Route 34 between Matawan and Cheesequake.

Route description

Route 79 begins at an intersection with US 9 in Freehold Township, heading north on South Street, a two-lane divided highway that soon becomes an undivided road. It interchanges with Route 33 and continues through a mix of residential and commercial areas. The route enters Freehold Borough, where it crosses Route 33 Business. Route 79 heads into downtown Freehold, where it crosses the Freehold Industrial Track railroad line operated by the Delaware and Raritan River Railroad and intersects CR 537. Here, the route heads northeast on Main Street to run concurrent with County Route 537 for a short distance. It eventually splits from CR 537 by forking to the left to head northeast on Broadway. The route travels on Broadway, as it heads past homes and eventually passes by Freehold High School at the corner of Route 79 and Dutch Lane Road (CR 46). Route 79 crosses back into Freehold Township, where it continues through suburban residential areas, with intermittent farms and woods. It heads into Marlboro Township, where the name becomes Marlboro Road. The route passes some businesses before it widens into a four-lane divided highway and comes to an interchange with the Route 18 freeway.

Past this interchange, Route 79 heads through a mix of homes and businesses, narrowing back into a two-lane undivided road. The name of the road changes to North Main Street at the School Road intersection. The road passes through residential and commercial areas with some farm fields, along with passing by Marlboro High School, and then intersecting with CR 520. Past this intersection, Route 79 continues north and heads into more suburban areas, with the Henry Hudson Trail parallel to the west of the road before it splits to the west. The road heads through wooded areas with some development, intersects CR 3 in Morganville, forming a short concurrency with that route that lasts until CR 3 heads northeast on Lloyd Road. Route 79 continues north through wooded neighborhoods and enters Matawan, where it becomes Main Street. It passes through residential areas and heads across the Henry Hudson Trail before the road crosses CR 516 in a commercial area. Route 79 continues a short distance north past this intersection to its northern terminus at Route 34. At this intersection, unsigned CR 516 Spur continues northeast on Main Street.

History

What has become Route 79 is an original road for the area. On June 7, 1701 a patent was granted to John Johnstone for a road from old Oysterbank Landing (Matawan Creek) to Wickatunk. This would have roughly followed that Route 79 path. Almost the entirety of the road was maintained in the late 19th century as part of the Monmouth County Plank Road. Before 1927, what is today Route 79 was an unnumbered road. In the 1927 New Jersey state highway renumbering, the route was legislated as part of Route 4, which was to run from Cape May to the George Washington Bridge. Between 1932 and 1934, the State Highway Department took over this section of the route, and US 9 was realigned to follow this portion of road along with Route 4. Beginning with a bypass of Freehold in 1938, US 9 and Route 4 were moved to a new alignment between Freehold and Cheesequake, and the former alignment between these two points became Route 4A, a spur of Route 4. The realignment was completed by 1941. In the 1953 New Jersey state highway renumbering, Route 4A became Route 79 between Freehold and Matawan and an extension of Route 34 between Matawan and Cheesequake. On December 15, 2006, a project which rebuilt the intersection between US 9 and Route 79 was completed. This project's goals included improved safety and reduced traffic congestion.

Major intersections

See also

References

External links

New Jersey Roads: Route 79
Speed Limits for State Roads: Route 79

079
Transportation in Monmouth County, New Jersey
U.S. Route 9